It Pays to Watch! is a money saving show presented and written by money saving expert Martin Lewis, co-presented by Ruth Liptrot. It aired on UK terrestrial channel Channel 5. It was repeated on UK digital channel Fiver as an extended version on Sundays providing extra tips known as It Pays to Watch More!

A new series began on 17 September 2008.

Premise
The show aims to help save and make consumers money. Money saving tips have ranged from claiming back old bank charges, something Lewis has campaigned for to completing surveys on the internet to make some extra cash. Lewis often states he wants consumers to take revenge on corporations to claim back money rightfully theirs.

Format
The show comprised four parts.

External links
 It Pays to Watch! official site
 Youtube channel of programmes

2008 British television series debuts
2008 British television series endings
British television talk shows
Channel 5 (British TV channel) original programming